Reynaldo Pérez Ramos (born 22 January 1994) is a Cuban football player. He plays for Pinar del Río.

International
He made his Cuba national football team debut on 29 March 2014 in a friendly against Indonesia.

He was selected for the 2019 CONCACAF Gold Cup squad.

References

External links
 
 

Living people
1994 births
Cuban footballers
Cuba international footballers
Association football midfielders
FC Pinar del Río players
FC Artemisa players
FC Ciudad de La Habana players
2019 CONCACAF Gold Cup players
People from Pinar del Río Province